Charles River Ventures (CRV) is a venture capital firm focused on early-stage investments in technology. The firm was founded in 1970 to commercialize research that came out of MIT. Its name comes from the Charles River.

History
The firm has raised over $4.3 billion since inception across 18 funds. Upon closing of the 16th fund, the firm rebranded to CRV. Prior to that, CRV's 15th fund closed in February 2012 with $375 million of investor commitments.  CRV's 14th fund raised $320 million of commitments.

In 2013, it purchased a large portion of Pebble Technology for 15 million dollars and is credited as the primary reason why Pebble was sold to Fitbit in December 2016. This netted CRV nearly 40 million dollars.

Among CRV's portfolio companies are Airtable, Amgen, Aveksa, Blippy, Cascade Communications, ChipCom, Ciena Corporation, ClassPass, Continental Cablevision, Crushpath, DoorDash, Drift, Earbits, Fiksu, iBasis, mabl, Netezza, OneLogin, Parametric Technology Corporation, PillPack, Ring, SimpliVity, Sonus Networks, SpeechWorks, Stella,  Stratus Technologies, Sybase, Twitter, Udacity, Vignette Corporation, Yammer, and Zendesk.

References

Venture Firm Is Giving Loans a Try. The New York Times, November 1, 2006
Why Venture Funds Don't Want Your Cash. The New York Times, July 12, 2004

External links

Venture capital firms of the United States
Financial services companies established in 1970
1970 establishments in Massachusetts